The Spike-Out Volleyball Tournament originated at the Indiana School for the Deaf in 1999 under the Athletic Director and Volleyball Coach Brian Bippus, who envisioned a national deaf volleyball tournament bringing together outstanding teams and athletes. The idea was to bring top teams to one site and let them “spike each other out” to claim the national championship. The school who wins that year's tournament often win the year's Deaf Prep National Volleyball Championship. Texas School for the Deaf Girls' was the team to win the inaugural SpikeOut Volleyball Tournament championship in 1999.

History of SpikeOut Tournament 
SpikeOut I (1999)

Champion: Texas School for the Deaf

2nd Place: Model Secondary School for the Deaf

Host: Indiana School for the Deaf (Indianapolis, IN)

SpikeOut II (2000)

Champions: Model Secondary School for the Deaf

2nd Place: Indiana School for the Deaf

Host: Model Secondary School for the Deaf (Washington, D.C.)

SpikeOut III (2001)

Champions: Indiana School for the Deaf

2nd Place: Model Secondary School for the Deaf

Host: Kansas State School For the Deaf (Olathe, KS)

SpikeOut IV (2002)

Champions: Indiana School for the Deaf

2nd Place: Maryland School for the Deaf

Host: Texas School for the Deaf (Austin, TX)

SpikeOut V (2003)

Champions: Maryland School for the Deaf

2nd Place: Indiana School for the Deaf

Host: Maryland School for the Deaf (Frederick, MD)

SpikeOut VI (2004)

Champions: Indiana School for the Deaf

2nd Place: Maryland School for the Deaf

Host: Minnesota State Academy for the Deaf (Faribault, MN)

SpikeOut VII (2005)

Champions: Indiana School for the Deaf

2nd Place: Maryland School for the Deaf

Host: California School for the Deaf, Fremont (Fremont, CA)

SpikeOut VIII (2006)

Champions: Maryland School for the Deaf

2nd Place: Texas School for the Deaf

Host: Indiana School for the Deaf (Indianapolis, IN)

SpikeOut VIV (2007)

Champions: Maryland School for the Deaf

2nd Place: Texas School for the Deaf

Host: Texas School for the Deaf (Austin, TX)

SpikeOut X (2008)

Champions: Maryland School for the Deaf

2nd Place: Indiana School for the Deaf

Host: Maryland School for the Deaf (Frederick, MD)

SpikeOut XI (2009)

Champions: Maryland School for the Deaf

2nd Place: Indiana School for the Deaf

Host: Wisconsin School for the Deaf (Delavan, WI)

SpikeOut XII (2010)

Champions: Maryland School for the Deaf

2nd Place: Indiana School for the Deaf

Host: California School for the Deaf, Riverside (Riverside, CA)

SpikeOut XIII (2011)

Champions: Indiana School for the Deaf

2nd Place: Maryland School for the Deaf

Host: Indiana School for the Deaf (Indianapolis, IN)

SpikeOut XIV (2012)

Champions: Texas School for the Deaf

2nd Place: Indiana School for the Deaf

Host: Arizona State Schools for the Deaf and Blind (Tucson, AZ)

SpikeOut XV (2013)

Champions: California School for the Deaf, Fremont

2nd Place: Maryland School for the Deaf

Host: Texas School for the Deaf (Austin, TX)

SpikeOut XVI (2014)

Champions: Maryland School for the Deaf

2nd Place: Indiana School for the Deaf

Host: Maryland School for the Deaf (Frederick, MD)

SpikeOut XVII (2015)

Champions: Maryland School for the Deaf

2nd Place: Indiana School for the Deaf

Host: California School for the Deaf, Fremont (Fremont, CA)

SpikeOut XVIII (2016)

Champions: Texas School for the Deaf

2nd Place: Maryland School for the Deaf

Host: Indiana School for the Deaf (Indianapolis, IN)

SpikeOut XIX (2017)

Champions: Texas School for the Deaf

2nd Place: Maryland School for the Deaf

Host: Maryland School for the Deaf (Frederick, MD)

SpikeOut XX (2018)

Champions: Maryland School for the Deaf

2nd Place: Texas School for the Deaf

Host: Model Secondary School for the Deaf (Washington, D.C.)

SpikeOut XXI (2019)

Div. 1 Champions: Texas School for the Deaf

Div. 1 2nd Place: Model Secondary School for the Deaf

Div. 2 Champions: Rochester School for the Deaf

Div. 2 2nd Place: Washington School for the Deaf

Host: California School for the Deaf, Riverside (Riverside, CA)

SpikeOut XXII (2021)

Div. 1 Champions: ?

Div. 1 2nd Place: ?

Div. 2 Champions: ?

Div 2 2nd Place: ?

Host: ?

Trivia 
 Texas School for the Deaf Girls' was the first team to win the annual SpikeOut Volleyball Tournament championship in 1999. 
 Model Secondary School for the Deaf was the first team to play in three consecutive championship games from 1999 to 2001.
 Maryland and Indiana is now tied in leading for hosting SpikeOut Tournament four times; Maryland hosted in 2003, 2008, 2014, 2017, and Indiana hosted in 1999, 2006, 2011 and 2016.
 Model, Indiana and Maryland are the only three schools that have won the SpikeOut Tournament on home turf - Model became the first team to do so in 2000, Indiana won on its home turf once in 2011, and Maryland is the only school to do it three times, in 2003, 2008 & 2014.
 Maryland had the most appearances in championship game; sixteen times out of twenty-one tournaments.
 Maryland and Indiana faced each other in championship game ten times, Maryland winning six titles while Indiana winning four titles. 
 Maryland is the first team to win five consecutive titles, from 2006 to 2010.
 Maryland is leading for winning the most SpikeOut titles, winning nine times. Indiana and Texas tied for second with five titles each.
 During SpikeOut XIV, Texas snapped Maryland's streak of 10 championship match appearances (2002-2011).
 Texas won their second SpikeOut title in 2012, and was first non-Oriole winner since Model won it in 2000.
 The Orioles mascot had appeared in SpikeOut finals twenty-nine times in the last twenty-one tournaments.
 In 2013, California School for the Deaf - Fremont became the 1st team from the West Coast to bring home the SpikeOut title.
 CSD-Fremont won their first ever SpikeOut volleyball title in 2013, becoming the third non-Orioles to win the tournament title.
 In last twenty-one tournaments, only five schools have won the SpikeOut volleyball titles; Maryland (9), Indiana (5), Texas (5), Model (1) and California-Fremont (1).
 Since 2002, Maryland has advanced to the championship match every year except for 2012 and 2019.

External links
 http://www.isdorioles.com/new/spikeout-history/

SpikeOut
Volleyball in Indiana
1999 establishments in Indiana